Coughlan (or   according to the cases,)  is a surname of Irish origin ( or ), meaning 'son of the one with the cloak'. Notable people with the surname include:

Cathal Coughlan (politician) (1937-1986), Irish Fianna Fáil politician
Cathal Coughlan (singer) (1960 - 2022), Irish singer songwriter
Clement Coughlan (1942–1983), Irish politician
Elaine Coughlan, Irish venture capitalist
Frank Coughlan (1904–1979), Australian jazz musician
Gerry Coughlan (1903–1983), Irish middle-distance runner
James Coughlan (field hockey) (born 1990), New Zealand field hockey player
John Coughlan (1898–1965), Irish sportsman
 John Coughlan, Australian airman who won the Conspicuous Gallantry Medal in 1968
Laurence Coughlan (before 1766after 1773), Irish-born itinerant preacher
Maria Coughlan (Moravskaya) (1890after 1947), Russian and American poet, writer, translator and literary critic; wife of Edward Coughlan
Mark Coughlan (born 1982), Australian rules footballer
Mary Coughlan (singer) (born 1956), Irish jazz singer
Mary Coughlan (politician) (born 1965), Irish Fianna Fáil politician and Tánaiste (deputy prime minister)
Nicola Coughlan (born 1987), Irish actress
Richard Coughlan (1947–2013), English musician
Stephen Coughlan (1910–1994), Irish politician
Terence Coughlan (born 1956), Zimbabwean cricketer
Tom Coughlan (hurler) (1881after 1911), Irish hurler
Craig Coughlan (footballer) (1976present), English footballer (goalkeeper)

References 

Anglicised Irish-language surnames
Surnames of Irish origin